The 2017–18 USC Trojans women's basketball team represents the University of Southern California during the 2017–18 NCAA Division I women's basketball season. The Trojans, led by first year head coach, 6th overall Mark Trakh, play their home games at the Galen Center and were members of the Pac-12 Conference. They finished the season 20–11, 9–9 in Pac-12 play to finish in seventh place. They defeated Washington State in the first round before losing to Stanford in the quarterfinals of the Pac-12 women's basketball tournament to Stanford. They would have clinched the automatic berth to the 2018 Women's National Invitation Tournament, but declined to participate, despite being the highest-ranked non-NCAA team in the Pac-12.

Previous season
They finished the season 14–16, 5–13 in Pac-12 play to finish in a 4-way tie for ninth place. They lost in the first round Pac-12 women's basketball tournament to California. After that game, Coach Cynthia Cooper-Dyke resigned.

Roster

Schedule

|-
!colspan=9 style=| Non-conference regular season

|-
!colspan=9 style=| Pac-12 regular season

|-
!colspan=9 style=| Pac-12 Women's Tournament

Rankings
2017–18 NCAA Division I women's basketball rankings

See also
 2017–18 USC Trojans men's basketball team

References

USC Trojans women's basketball seasons
USC
USC Trojans basketball, women
USC Trojans basketball, women
USC Trojans basketball, women
USC Trojans basketball, women